University College Boat Club (commonly abbreviated to UCBC) is the rowing club for all members of University College, Oxford ("Univ").

History
The idea of inter collegiate racing was pioneered by Brasenose College Boat Club and Jesus College Boat Club in 1815. In 1827, it was decided to form a University College eight. The origins of UCBC can be attributed to one student, William Roper, who supervised the raising of £100 to build a boat and select a crew. Whilst the crew did not compete in 1829 or 1832-8 it has done so almost continuously until the present day, first going Head of the River in 1841. By the mid-1850s the Boat Club was enjoying a centrality to college life that it has not lost. The mid nineteenth century was a period of great success for UCBC being Head of the River in 1869–71, 1874–5 and 1877–8. One undergraduate Charles Cree recorded the celebrations in 1871:

Univ won the headship in 1914, the college now being in possession of an original commemorative blade from that time.  Sadly, many of that crew did not live to see the end of the Great War. Stephen Hawking was a member of the club in the 1960s, coxing the Men's Second VIII. The club features on the front cover of his autobiography, My Brief History.

The Univ Women's First Eight are currently Eights Head of the River, taking the headship from Wolfson in Eights Week 2022. Univ Men's First Eight was last Eights Head of the River from 1990 to 1991.

Recent Results

In Summer Eights, the Women's 1st VIII won the Headship in 2022 and achieved Blades in 2010, 2011 and 2015, and the Women's 2nd VIII won Blades in Summer Eights 2014 and again in Summer Eights 2018. In lower-down the divisions, the club qualified more boats for Eights 2012 and 2014 than any other college, and with 8 'Eights' competing in 2022. The men's side 1st Eight is, as of 2022, eleventh on the river, with three crews in fixed divisions.

In Torpids, the Women's 1st Torpid won the Headship in 2023 and achieved Blades in 2010, 2011 and 2021. As of 2023, they are in first position on the river. The Men's 1st Torpid is currently 5th in division 1.

Novice training is strong, with large numbers of boats entered every year for Nepthys Regatta and Christ Church Regatta. Indeed, the former was won in 2012 and 2021 by the Men's Novice A crew.

Additionally, in external regattas and races, Univ Women won Novice Eights at Bedford Regatta, 56th place in Women's Head of the River and 4th place in the Intermediate Academic Coxed Fours at Henley Women's Regatta.

The Boathouse

UCBC's boathouse is shared with the boat clubs of Somerville College, St Peter's College and Wolfson College. The original 19th century boathouse, designed by John Oldrid Scott, succumbed to arson in 1999. After eight years, a new boathouse was finished, designed by Belsize Architects. The Boathouse has been awarded a Royal Institute of British Architects (RIBA) prize. The £2.7million structure has enjoyed a favourable reception in the architectural world. Yuli Toh's article describes the structure as not just a boathouse, but "a grandstand of the first order" arguing that it represents a new age in rowing. The Boathouse was also subject of a recent article in the Row360 rowing magazine.

Saturday of Eights’ Week 2007 saw the opening of the new boathouse by Colin Moynihan (1974) who coxed the College and the University, won a silver medal at the Moscow Olympics in 1980, gained a boxing Blue, later became Minister of Sport, and is now Chairman of the British Olympic Association. The ceremony also marked the dedication of the Coleman Viewing Terrace by financial donors Jimmy Coleman (1963) and Jamie Coleman (1994).

Equipment

The men's side of the boat club uses the following shells:

The women's side of the Boat Club uses the following shells:

The boathouse gym is equipped with 8 Model D Concept2 indoor rowers, stretching/exercise mats and balls, and a full weights suite, along with changing rooms for crews.

Notable alumni of UCBC
Colin Moynihan, Olympic Silver Medallist Moscow 1980 Olympics and Chairman of the British Olympic Committee.
Acer Nethercott, Olympic Silver Medallist, Cox GB 8+, Beijing 2008 Olympics.
Mark Evans and J. Michael Evans Olympic Gold Medallists, Canadian 8+, Los Angeles 1984 Olympics.
Tom Solesbury, GB pair, Beijing 2008 Olympics, and GB Quad, London 2012 Olympics.
Stephen Hawking, physicist.  Coxed whilst studying at Univ, prior to his debilitating illness.
Roz Savage, ocean rower, speaker and campaigner.  First woman ever to row solo across three oceans.

Social events
UCBC organises several social events per term, ranging from crew dates and pub crawls through to formal dinners, held to celebrate both Torpids and Eights.

Dinosaurs and Cassandrians
Univ members who have rowed or coxed at least two days of Summer Eights as part of the Men's 1st VIII are entitled to become a member of the Dinosaurs society.  Members who have rowed or coxed at least two days of Summer Eights as part of the Women's 1st VIII are entitled to become a member of the Cassandrians society.  An annual Dinosaurs and Cassandrians dinner is held (usually in January) where many Old Members return to the college to celebrate Univ rowing with current members. A related club is the Univ Dinosaurs and Cassandrians Ironman Triathlon Club (UDCITC).

Honours

Henley Royal Regatta

References

External links
University College Oxford (University College website)
University College Boat Club (Club Facebook page)

Rowing clubs of the University of Oxford
Boat Club
Sports clubs established in 1827
1827 establishments in England
Rowing clubs in Oxfordshire
Rowing clubs of the River Thames